Michael Joseph Corcoran  (1882–1950) was a Major League Baseball second baseman. He played in 14 games for the 1910 Cincinnati Reds. He played in the minor leagues through 1924 and had brief stints as a manager in the minors in 1922 and 1924.

Sources

Major League Baseball second basemen
Cincinnati Reds players
Baseball players from Buffalo, New York
Minor league baseball managers
Bradford Drillers players
Buffalo Bisons (minor league) players
Montreal Royals players
Baltimore Orioles (IL) players
Scranton Miners players
Utica Utes players
Bridgeport Americans players
Hamilton Tigers (baseball) players
Quebec Bulldogs (baseball) players
1882 births
1950 deaths